George Alexander Stevens (1710 – 6 September 1780) was an English actor, playwright, poet, composer and songwriter. He was born in the parish of St. Andrews, in Holborn, a neighbourhood of London.  After spending many years as a travelling actor, he performed for the theatre in Covent Garden (now the Royal Opera House).

Stevens was most famous in his lifetime for his Lecture on Heads, a satirical "lecture" on heads and fashion, which parodied the popularity of physiognomy.  The lecture was first performed in 1764, and became an immediate success; he went on to perform it on tour throughout Great Britain, in Ireland, and in the American colonies at Boston and Philadelphia.

He was also known as popular songwriter, especially known for his bawdy drinking-songs and patriotic songs (such as Liberty-Hall and The Briton).  Many of both kinds were collected in his Songs, comic and satyrical (1788).

Stevens also authored several dramatic pieces for the stage, a novel entitled Tom Fool, and a satire, The Birthday of Folly.  He used the pen-name "A Lady", for part of The Female Inquisition.

He died in Baldock in Hertfordshire.

References

 Thomas Campbell (1819), Specimens of the British Poets, pp. 436–440. Available through Google Books Library Project.

External links
 
 
 G. A. Stevens at the University of Texas English Poetry Full-Text Database
George Alexander Stevens at the Eighteenth-Century Poetry Archive (ECPA)
George Alexander Stevens. The celebrated lecture on heads, broadside, 1765 Sept. 12, held by the Billy Rose Theatre Division, New York Public Library for the Performing Arts

1710 births
1780 deaths
English songwriters